Shirlee Busbee (born August 9, 1941) is an American writer of romance novels since 1977. With over nine million copies of her books in print, she is the recipient of numerous awards for excellence in writing, including the Romantic Times Reviewers' Choice Award and Affaire de Coeur's Silver and Bronze Pen Awards.

Biography
Shirlee Elaine was born in San Jose, California, the first daughter of a career naval officer. She grew up with two sisters and three brothers traveling the world. She attended high school in Kenitra, Morocco and when she returned to California, went to Burbank Business College in Santa Rosa, where she met her future husband Howard Busbee, she received a certificate in 1962. On June 22, 1963, she married Howard.

Later, she worked as a draftsman in Solano County, where she met her friend and mentor, the author Rosemary Rogers. She lives in Northern California, where they raise American Shetland Ponies and own Miniature Schnauzers.

Bibliography

Single novels
This Spanish Rose, 1986/Jul	
Love a Dark Rider, 1994/Jul	
Lovers Forever, 1996/May	
A Heart for the Taking,	1997/Sep	
Love Be Mine,	1998/Nov	
For Love Alone, 2000/May	
At Long Last, 2000/Dec	
Swear by the Moon, 2001/Dec

Louisiana series
Gypsy Lady, 1977/Dec	
Lady Vixen, 1980/Mar	
While Passion Sleeps, 1983/Mar
Deceive Not My Heart, 1984/Jun	
The Tiger Lily,	1985/Jul	
Midnight Masquerade, 1988/Aug	
Whisper to Me of Love, 1991/Apr	
Each Time We Love, 1993/May

Ballinger Family series
Return to Oak Valley,	2002/Dec	
Coming Home, 2003/Sep

Becomes Her series
Scandal Becomes Her, 2007/Jul
Seduction Becomes Her, 2008/Jul
Surrender Becomes Her, 2009/Jul
Passion Becomes Her, 2010/Jul
Rapture Becomes Her, 2011/Jul
Desire Becomes Her, 2012/Jul

References and sources

1941 births
20th-century American novelists
21st-century American novelists
American romantic fiction writers
American women novelists
Living people
Writers from San Jose, California
Writers from Santa Rosa, California
20th-century American women writers
21st-century American women writers